Cidade Universitária is a neighborhood in the North Zone of Rio de Janeiro, Brazil, on the artificial island of Fundão Island.

Neighbourhoods in Rio de Janeiro (city)
Federal University of Rio de Janeiro